The World Athletics Continental Tour is an annual series of independent track and field athletic competitions, recognised by World Athletics (formerly known as the IAAF). The Tour forms the second tier of international one-day meetings after the Diamond League. First held in 2020, it replaced the IAAF World Challenge series.

Initially divided into three levels – Gold, Silver and Bronze – The Continental Tour was expanded in 2022 with the fourth tier: Challenger. The Gold meetings are organised globally, with investment from World Athletics, and represent the second tier of meetings in the sport. Area associations are responsible for managing the Silver and Bronze level competitions.

Editions

Gold standard meetings

The number in the table represents the order in which the meeting took place.

References

External links

 
Recurring sporting events established in 2020
Annual athletics series
Continental Tour